Chin Kah Mun (born 25 March 1995) is a Malaysian female badminton player. In 2015, she won the women's doubles event at the Hungarian International Badminton Championships partnered with Cheah Yee See.

Achievements

BWF International Challenge/Series
Women's Doubles

 BWF International Challenge tournament
 BWF International Series tournament
 BWF Future Series tournament

References

External links
 

1995 births
Living people
People from Ipoh
Malaysian sportspeople of Chinese descent
Malaysian female badminton players
21st-century Malaysian women